The Moncton Wildcats are a junior ice hockey team in the Quebec Major Junior Hockey League from Moncton, New Brunswick, Canada. The franchise was granted for the 1995–96 season, known as the Moncton Alpines for one season, and as the Wildcats since. The team played at the Moncton Coliseum from 1995 until 2018, and moved into the Avenir Centre  for the 2018–19 season. After winning the 2005–06 QMJHL championship, the team hosted the 2006 Memorial Cup.  The Wildcats also won the 2009–10 QMJHL championship, which sent the team to compete in the 2010 Memorial Cup in Brandon, Manitoba. They were eliminated from contention after going winless in the round robin portion of the tournament.

History
The Moncton Alpines joined the Quebec Major Junior Hockey League in the wake of successful expansion to Halifax, Nova Scotia, for the 1995–96 season. They played for one season under the ownership of racing driver John Graham and coached by Lucien DeBlois. However, the Alpines struggled mightily both on and off the ice. The team went through an initial year of financial difficulty and struggled to attract fans. There was some discussion of folding or moving the team, but instead the franchise was purchased by Robert Irving on May 28, 1996. On June 19, 1996, the team was officially renamed to the Moncton Wildcats and the new uniforms and logo were unveiled. The Wildcats' first game took place on September 22, 1996, in front of 7,506 fans. They won 9-6 over the Victoriaville Tigres. The team finished 16–52–2 for 34 points and last place.

The first few years of the Wildcats in Moncton featured a gradual improvement in the team's fortunes as more teams were added to the Maritimes and junior hockey took hold in the region. The 1999–2000 team dominated with a 44−20−5−3 record. In the playoffs the team steamrolled to the QMJHL semi-final against Rimouski. Injuries robbed the Wildcats of Simon Laliberte and Mirko Murovic, but the final blow to the Wildcats came just before the semi-final started, when team leading scorer Jonathan Roy was diagnosed with cancer. The off-ice distractions took their toll and Moncton lost the series in five games. Roy would ultimately beat cancer and went on to a pro career in the minor pro, European and senior ranks.

The next few seasons featured more rebuilding. In 2002–03, Corey Crawford's goaltending and Steve Bernier's 101 points led the Wildcats to a 37−20−10−5 record. In the playoffs, they fell in the quarter-final four games to two against the Quebec Remparts. At the NHL Draft Steve Bernier was selected 16th Overall by San Jose, goalie Corey Crawford by Chicago in the 2nd Round, and Nathan Saunders by Anaheim in the 4th Round.

In 2003–04, Corey Crawford set a team record for wins with 35, and 4 players had 30+ goal seasons: Steve Bernier with 36, Mathieu Bétournay with 33, Konstantin Zakharov with 33, and Mārtiņš Karsums with 30. In the first Round, Moncton defeated the Baie-Comeau Drakkar in four games. In the quarter-final, they beat the PEI Rocket four games to two. In the semifinal, they finally defeated arch-rival Rimouski Océanic four games to one. In the President's Cup Final for the first time, Moncton lost to the Gatineau Olympiques four games to one.

In 2004–05, the "Sidney Crosby Show" was selling out buildings everywhere, and with the NHL lockout, Corey Crawford stayed in Moncton. Helped by his backup, Jean-Christophe Blanchard, they finished with a combined 2.47 GAA, best in the QMJHL. Steve Bernier again had a 30+ goal season, with 36. Adam Pineault had 26 goals, while Bruce Graham chipped in 23, and Stéphane Goulet finished with 22. Nathan Saunders set a new club record with 198 penalty minutes, finishing with a career record of 794 PIMS. In the playoffs, the Cats took Drummondville in the first round, four games to two before being knocked out by the Rouyn-Noranda Huskies four games to two.

In 2005, it was announced that Moncton would host the 2006 Memorial Cup. The team hired former NHL coach of the year Ted Nolan, and acquired players such as Keith Yandle, and various rookies. The team's slogan for 2005–06 was "New Coach, New Team, New Attitude". The Wildcats finished in first place in the league, going 52-15-0-3 for 107 points and winning the Jean Rougeau Trophy for the first time in club history. The Cats acquired Victoriaville Tigres goalie Josh Tordjman halfway through the season, as well as Luc Bourdon from the Val-d'Or Foreurs. They defeated Victoriaville four games to one in the first round, and did the same to the Halifax Mooseheads. The Wildcats defeated the Gatineau Olympiques four games to one in the third round. to return to the President's Cup, this time against Patrick Roy's Quebec Remparts. In Game 1, Moncton beat the Remparts 4-3 in overtime. Some more OT heroics resulted in a 3-2 win in Game 2. Quebec battled back for Game 3, winning 3-1. The Remparts tied the series at 2-2 with a 4-3 OT victory in Game 4. In Game 5, Moncton again used OT to get by Quebec 3-2. In Game 6, in front of a sold-out Moncton Coliseum crowd, Moncton took the trophy home, winning 3-2.

In the Memorial Cup against the Remparts, Vancouver Giants and Peterborough Petes,  Moncton finished second in the round-robin after defeating Peterborough and Vancouver but losing to Quebec. The Wildcats defeated the Giants in the semi-final, but lost to the Remparts 6-2 in the Memorial Cup final.

Nolan went on to an NHL coaching job with the New York Islanders, along with assistant coach Danny Flynn. He was replaced by another coach with an NHL resume in John Torchetti. Torchetti led a young team to a 39-25-4-2 record before losing to the Halifax Mooseheads four games to three in the first round of the playoffs. Torchetti moved on to accept a post as associate coach with the Chicago Blackhawks.

The Wildcats brought Flynn back as their new head coach and director of hockey operations for 2007–08. Flynn traded away top veterans Phil Mangan, Matt Marquardt and Murdock MacLellan at the Christmas trading period and guided the team to a 21-34-5-10 record. The team set a new franchise mark for offensive futility, scoring just 191 goals. Ralph Diamond took over the captaincy after Mangan's departure, and was honoured as the QMJHL and Canadian Hockey League Humanitarian of the Year for his extensive work in the community.

In the 2008–09 season, the Wildcats set two QMJHL records. They beat the record for most games straight with at least one point at the start of a season. They also set the record for most consecutive road wins at the start of a season. They finished the season with the second highest points total in franchise history with 102. On March 15, 2009, goaltender Nicola Riopel set a regular season record with a goals against average of 2.01., beating the previous record of 2.09 set 1997–98 by Patrick Couture. The 2008–09 team also established a new league record of 149 goals allowed in one season. The previous record was held in 2003–04 by the Cape Breton Screaming Eagles (164).

Coaches

1995–1996 Lucien DeBlois: 14–48–8–0
1996–1997 Bill Riley: 16–52–2–0
1997–2000 Réal Paiement: 111–77–21–3
2000–2001 Tom Coolen (Fired in November 2001): 43–82–10–9
2001–2005 Christian La Rue (Fired in January 2005): 126–91–21–0
2005 Daniel Lacroix: 8–8–5
2005–2006 Ted Nolan: 52–15–0–3
2006–2007 John Torchetti: 39–25–4–2
2007–2013 Danny Flynn: 222–151–47
2013–2019 Darren Rumble: 33–32–0–3 
2019 John Torchetti: 24–9–0
2019–present Daniel Lacroix

NHL alumni

Dmitry Afanasenkov
Evgeny Artyukhin
Jean-Sébastien Aubin
Ivan Barbashev
Mark Barberio
Oskars Bārtulis
François Beauchemin
Steve Bernier
Luc Bourdon
Gabriel Bourque
Corey Crawford
Pierre Dagenais
Jean-François Damphousse
Jason Demers
Nicolas Deschamps
Louis Domingue
Philippe Dupuis
Jonathan Ferland
Conor Garland
Jonathan Girard
Brandon Gormley
Dmitri Kalinin
Mārtiņš Karsums
Simon Lajeunesse
Andrew MacDonald
Zack MacEwen
Brad Marchand
Johnny Oduya
Pierre-Alexandre Parenteau
Adam Pineault
Jean-François Racine
Jérôme Samson
David Savard
Zack Sill
Jordan Spence
Alexei Tezikov
Patrick Thoresen
Josh Tordjman
Keith Yandle

Yearly results
1995–96 Moncton Alpines
1996–present Moncton Wildcats

Regular season
Legend: OTL = Overtime loss, SL = Shootout loss

Playoffs

2006 Memorial Cup: Finished Memorial Cup round-robin in second place. Defeated Vancouver Giants 4-1 in the semi-final. Lost to Quebec Remparts 6-2 in Memorial Cup final.

2010 Memorial Cup:Finished Memorial Cup round-robin in fourth place and eliminated from contention.

See also
List of ice hockey teams in New Brunswick

References

External links
 Official Site
 2015-16 regular season roster
 QMJHL stats

Quebec Major Junior Hockey League teams
Ice hockey teams in New Brunswick
Wildcats
Ice hockey clubs established in 1996
1996 establishments in New Brunswick